Whitegate and Marton is a civil parish in Cheshire West and Chester, England.  It contains 33 buildings that are recorded in the National Heritage List for England as designated listed buildings.  One of these, Vale Royal Abbey is listed at Grade II*, and the others are at Grade II.  The parish is almost entirely rural, and most of the listed buildings are domestic or related to farming.  The older houses and cottages are frequently wholly or partly timber-framed.  The River Weaver and the Weaver Navigation run through the parish, and some of the listed structures are related to these waterways.  Other listed buildings in the parish include ancient stones, monuments, structures related to Vale Royal Abbey, and St Mary's Church, Whitegate, its gatepiers, and its lychgate.

Key

Buildings

See also

Listed buildings in Cuddington
Listed buildings in Davenham
Listed buildings in Delamere
Listed buildings in Hartford
Listed buildings in Little Budworth
Listed buildings in Moulton
Listed buildings in Winsford

References
Citations

Sources

Listed buildings in Cheshire West and Chester
Lists of listed buildings in Cheshire